The Bragassa Toy Store is a historic commercial building located in Lynchburg, Virginia. In 1871, Francisco Bragassa purchased the property and in 1875 to 1876, he built the confectionery and toy store in Italianate style. The Bragassa store was at the center of a new, expanding commercial section of town during the Reconstruction period. It is the only surviving building within a four-block area that represents this commercial expansion. The building contains comfortable living quarters upstairs, with the merchandise on the ground floor. At the front of the shop were the first plate glass windows ever installed in Lynchburg.  The store remained in the Bragassa family until 1987. In January 1988 the Lynchburg Historical Foundation purchased the building from the Bragassa family. In November 2008, the building was occupied by Kid's Haven: A Center for Grieving Children.

It was listed on the National Register of Historic Places in 1991.

References

Commercial buildings on the National Register of Historic Places in Virginia
Italianate architecture in Virginia
Commercial buildings completed in 1876
Buildings and structures in Lynchburg, Virginia
National Register of Historic Places in Lynchburg, Virginia